The Kajang High School (Malay: Sekolah Menengah Kebangsaan Tinggi Kajang), better known by its abbreviation of KHS in English and SMKTK in Bahasa Malaysia, is a national secondary school (Sekolah Menengah Kebangsaan) in Kajang, Hulu Langat District, Selangor, Malaysia. It is the oldest school in Kajang and the district of Hulu Langat when the first block was erected at Mile 14 Cheras Road (Jalan Cheras), (located at latitude 2°59'37.49"N and longitude 101°47'45.65"E) opposite Jamek Mosque of Kajang.

The former site is a vacant lot that held satay stalls in 1903 CE and later shifted to its permanent site at beside of Semenyih Road, a hilly area where the first block (Blok Utama) was constructed. The word high in Kajang High School gets its meaning, from the namesake of being located on top a hill.

History
Kajang High School or High SMK short name Kajang, is a Secondary School located in Jalan Semenyih. In 2009, Kajang High School has 1306 male and 113 female students, making a total enrolment of 1419 people.

The school was founded on 17 March 1919. Kajang High School (SMK Kajang High) was originally known as the Government English School Kajang. The original building is the old Government Rest House near the Kajang Police Station. Number of students at the beginning of the 70 men and women.

The establishment of this school was championed by Taukeh Ng Bow Thai, the late Raja Alang, Mr. Arumpalan, Mr. V. Sabapathy and Mr. Gan Boon Teik. Around 1916, they applied to establish an English school in Kajang district.  Initially, the school accepted students for class preparation and Lower Middle Class. Teaching staff consists of a principal and three teachers.

The subjects taught were English, English literature, geography, history, mathematics (math), algebra, geometry, drawing, writing and hygiene. At the end of the year students sat for Junior and Senior Cambridge examinations held every year at the Town Hall, Kuala Lumpur. Eleven years later, the school moved to current location and changed its name to Kajang High School. The present main building was inaugurated by Sultan Suleiman Shah KCMG Alaiddin Sultan of Selangor, on 1 April 1930. At the time, it had a total of 402 students.

In 1932, enrollment increased by 403 people and had its own examination center for the first time since its inception. By 1933, that number dropped to 318 people only because of the global economic slump. Before the war, there were only 13 classes and teachers worked one or two hours a day in school. When the Japanese invaded Malaya, the school building was taken over by the Australian army as a place to stay. Operations of the school were moved to Sekolah Convent Kajang.

From 6 December 1941 to 12 September 1945 school building became the headquarters of the Japanese army and the name of the school was changed to "Toa Seinen Gakko". The school was moved again, this time to the National Cinema (now the center of Karaoke). It also became the first Teacher Training College in the country and housed all the books from Raffles College. After the war ended, the books were sent back to Raffles College (Singapore) in 1946. The school building was not damaged World War II. After the war, the number of students increased rapidly. Many students who attended school in 1941 returned school in 1945.

Science was first introduced in 1946. For the first year, it was only taught in the classroom while the lab was being set up. Then, two lab classes were created.

On 7 April 1955, a primary school (School 1 and 2 as school supplies) was opened by HRH Sir Hishamud'din Alam Shah KMCG. The Sultan of Selangor. The number of students this year has risen to 1143 compared with an average of 300 people in the days before World War II.

In 1958, the High SMK Kajang divided into two separate parts, namely Primary and Secondary Schools as well as under the Teachers and Administration Manager is a separate body. In the same year, a workshop for vocational subjects (carpentry, metal work, study and analyse the electrical power) is completed. The first batch of students to pursue studies were initiated when the Comprehensive Education system is introduced. Additional rooms built in the early months of next December 1964 for teaching Industrial Arts. On 30 July 1960, the school library was created. It was called Low Ti Kok, named after one of the founders of the High SMK Kajang. YB Encik Abdul Rahman bin Haji Talib (Minister of Education Federation of Malaya) officiated the opening ceremony .

A science block was officially opened on 23 July 1970. To accommodate students who live far away, a small dormitory was built out of wood which houses about 90 students. Construction of the new hostel building began in 1972 and completed in 1973 and was officially opened on 1 July 1975 by Mr. Chan Sang Chang on behalf of then Prime Minister of Malaysia, Tun Dr. Mahathir Mohamad. This hostel was later known as Tun Dr. Abdul Aziz Hostel. However, it caught fire in April 1998 and has since undergone renovation and repairs and as of 2015 is still operating to cater to students from Selangor and other states.

By 1982, the school consisted of 11 blocks of 31 classrooms, four science laboratories, 4 rooms carpentry, 1 library room, 1 hall, 2 canteens and hostels.

On 2 June 1988, a new building block containing eight classrooms was used to accommodate a floating classroom that has been around since 1982. The school also received a mosque named "Al - Rahman" and was inaugurated on 13 February 1993. Building "board" has also been turned into stone buildings starting in October 1994. At the end of 1998, the work of building another block of four storey building has commenced.

Motto
The school motto is Berilmu, Berdispilin and Berjaya meaning Knowledge and Discipline empowers Success.

From the 1920s to 1970s the Latin motto was 'Labor omnia vincit' meaning 'Work conquers all' or 'Hardwork overcomes all difficulties.'

Address
Sekolah Menengah Kebangsaan Tinggi Kajang,
Jalan Semenyih, Bandar Kajang
43000 Kajang, Malaysia

References

Educational institutions established in 1919
Schools in Selangor
Secondary schools in Malaysia
High School